José Fernandes may refer to:

 José Fernandes (fencer) (born 1934), Portuguese fencer
 José Fernandes (cyclist) (born 1995), Portuguese cyclist